Humpty Dumpty Snack Foods is an American food company, operating as a subsidiary of Old Dutch Foods, that packages and sells snack foods. The company is named after the nursery rhyme character and features the character as the company logo. Humpty Dumpty products are generally sold in New England, Quebec and Atlantic Canada.

History
Humpty Dumpty Potato Chip Company, Inc., was founded in 1947 in Scarborough, Maine, United States, by George Robinson and Norman Cole,  producing ketchup-flavoured and sour-cream-and-clam-flavoured chips, among others.

The company was acquired by Borden, Inc., in February 1989.

In January 2000, it was then sold to the Canadian firm Small Fry, formally adopting the name Humpty Dumpty Snack Foods Inc.

In 2006, the company was acquired in a takeover bid by Old Dutch Foods, a Minnesota-based snack food company. After the acquisition, Humpty Dumpty potato chip products were rebranded as Old Dutch potato chips. Old Dutch Foods kept the Humpty Dumpty label, and still sells all their flavors of chips and snacks in the USA. In Canada, Humpty Dumpty's potato chip line were rebranded "Old Dutch", as it was already an established brand of potato chip in other parts of Canada; they kept the "Humpty Dumpty" name for its other snacks.

Humpty Dumpty originally sold a variety of potato chip flavors. For the original brand of chips, they included Regular, BBQ, Ketchup, Dill Pickle, Salt and Vinegar, Roast Chicken, Sour Cream and Onion, Smokin' Bacon, and a St-Hubert rotisserie chicken flavor.

For their ridged chip line, called Ripples, there were five varieties: Regular, Buffalo Wing, BBQ & Cheddar, Au Gratin, and All-Dressed. And finally, for their line of kettle-cooked chips, flavors featured were Regular, Jalapeño, Salt and Vinegar, BBQ, and Cheddar.

Current product line
The current Humpty Dumpty snack line of products sold in the United States and Canada include Bacon & Hickory Potato Sticks, BBQ Corn Chips, BBQ Ringolos, Ketchup Ringolos,  Chedacorn, Cheese Sticks, Cruncheez (in both Regular and Nacho Cheese), Party Mix (Original, Cheesy, and All Dressed), and Sour Cream & Onion Rings.

Humpty Dumpty's potato chip line is sold only in the United States, and consists of Regular, BBQ, Ketchup, Dill Pickle, Salt and Vinegar, and Buffalo Wings & Cheese, as well as limited-run flavors such as Cheddar & Sour Cream. Humpty Dumpty's ridged chip varieties include Regular, and All-Dressed. Most of these flavors are sold in Canada under the Old Dutch brand, which took over Humpty Dumpty's potato chip line in Canada after acquiring the company in 2006. Old Dutch kept the Humpty Dumpty brand for potato chips in the US, as the brand was very well-known throughout New England, while the Old Dutch brand is known mainly in the midwestern states.

Downsizing
The company closed its Quebec-based Montreal Humpty Dumpty plant on September 27, 2013; that plant started operating in 1964. Four other Canadian plants, in other provinces, are unaffected.

References

External links
Product page

1947 establishments in Maine
Food and drink companies based in Maine
Scarborough, Maine
Companies based in Cumberland County, Maine
Food and drink companies of Canada
Brand name snack foods